Kirill Olegovich Sosunov (born 1 November 1975 in Ryazan) is a Russian long jumper and bobsledder. He is the 1998 European champion, and that year he also set his personal best jump with 8.38 metres. The previous year he had won World Championships medals both indoor and outdoor.
He switched to bobsled in 2005.
Sosunov is married to high jumper Olga Kaliturina.

Competition record

External links 

1975 births
Living people
Russian male long jumpers
Athletes (track and field) at the 2000 Summer Olympics
Athletes (track and field) at the 2004 Summer Olympics
Olympic athletes of Russia
Russian male bobsledders
Sportspeople from Ryazan
World Athletics Championships medalists
European Athletics Championships medalists
Universiade medalists in athletics (track and field)
Universiade gold medalists for Russia
Medalists at the 1995 Summer Universiade
Competitors at the 1998 Goodwill Games